The 1959–60 Southern Football League season was the 57th in the history of the league, an English football competition.

The league split into a Premier Division and Division One, the first time the league had had two hierarchical divisions since 1919–20. Bath City won the championship, whilst Clacton Town, Romford, Folkestone Town and Guildford City were all promoted to the Premier Division. Eleven Southern League clubs applied to join the Football League at the end of the season, but none were successful.

Premier Division
Premier Division was formed at the end of the previous season, with eleven top clubs from both North-West and South-East divisions joined.

At the end of the season Headington United was renamed Oxford United.

League table

Division One
Division One was formed at the end of the previous season with clubs finished below eleventh place in North-West and South East divisions joined. Also, Division One featured ten new clubs:
Eight clubs from the disbanded Kent League:
Ashford Town (Kent)
Bexleyheath & Welling
Dover
Folkestone Town
Margate
Ramsgate Athletic
Sittingbourne
Tunbridge Wells United

Plus:
Hinckley Athletic, from the Birmingham & District League
Romford, from the Isthmian League

League table

Football League elections
Eleven Southern League clubs (including Guildford City and Romford from Division One) applied for election to the Football League. Although none were successful, Peterborough United were elected at the expense of Gateshead.

References

Southern Football League seasons
S